Zeppelin-Staaken (sometimes Zeppelin Werke Staaken or Zeppelin-Werke GmbH), was a German aircraft manufacturer originally located in Gotha. The company built the largest aircraft of World War I, the "Riesenflugzeug" (giant aircraft).

Aircraft built

Zeppelin-Staaken Riesenflugzeuge
Zeppelin-Staaken R.IV 
Zeppelin-Staaken R.V 
Zeppelin-Staaken R.VI
Zeppelin-Staaken R.VII
Zeppelin-Staaken 8301
Zeppelin-Staaken R.XIV 
Zeppelin-Staaken R.XV 
Zeppelin-Staaken R.XVI
Zeppelin-Staaken E-4/20

See also
Riesenflugzeug

References

Citations

Bibliography

External links

Zeppelin-Staaken R.III German Military Aviation Service